Dimitrios Savvas (born 17 September 1939) is a retired Greco-Roman wrestler from Greece who competed at the 1964 and 1968 Summer Olympics.

References

External links
 

1939 births
Living people
Olympic wrestlers of Greece
Wrestlers at the 1964 Summer Olympics
Wrestlers at the 1968 Summer Olympics
Sportspeople from Florina